Marcelo Demoliner and João Souza were the defending champions but they decided not to participate.
Unseeded pairs Guido Andreozzi and Máximo González defeated another unseeded pairing of Thiago Alves and Thiago Monteiro 6–4, 6–4.

Seeds

Draw

Draw

References
 Main Draw

Tetra Pak Tennis Cup - Doubles
2013 Doubles